Hungary competed at the 1912 Summer Olympics in Stockholm, Sweden. Austrian and Hungarian results at early Olympic Games are generally kept separate despite the union of the two nations as Austria-Hungary at the time. 121 competitors, all men, took part in 52 events in 11 sports.

Medalists

The following Hungarian competitors won medals at the games. In the discipline sections below, the medalists' names are bolded.

| width=78% align=left valign=top |

Default sort order: Medal, Date, Name

| style="text-align:left; width:22%; vertical-align:top;"|

Multiple medalists

The following competitors won multiple medals at the 1912 Olympic Games.

Competitors

| width=78% align=left valign=top |

The following is the list of number of competitors participating in the Games:

| width="22%" style="text-align:left; vertical-align:top" |

The following is the list of dates, when Hungary won medals:

Aquatics

Swimming

Eight swimmers competed for Hungary at the 1912 Games. It was the fifth time the nation appeared in swimming, in which Hungary had competed at every Olympic Games.

The 1912 Games were the first time that no Hungarian swimmer won a medal. Baronyi and Las-Torres each made a final once, placing fourth and fifth, respectively. The relay team also advanced to the final, but did not start.

Ranks given for each swimmer are within the heat.

 Men

Water polo

Hungary made its Olympic debut in 1912. The squad's last place finish and 0–2 record are somewhat misleading; Hungary lost both its matches by a single goal in each.

 Quarterfinals

 Repechage semifinal

Athletics

27 athletes represented Hungary. It was the fifth appearance of the nation in athletics, in which Hungary had competed at each Olympics. Kóczán's bronze medal in the javelin throw was the only athletics medal won by a Hungarian; he and Wardener were the only two to advance to the finals via eliminations (Kárpáti and Ripszám ran the marathon, which consisted of only the final). Wardener finished 9th in the high jump.

Ranks given are within that athlete's heat for running events.

Cycling

Five cyclists represented Hungary. It was the first appearance of the nation in cycling. István Müller had the best time in the time trial, the only race held, finishing 73rd. The four Hungarian cyclists who finished had a combined time that placed them twelfth in the team competition.

Road cycling

Fencing

Thirteen fencers represented Hungary, including six of the eight men who had competed in 1908. It was the third appearance of the nation in fencing. The Hungarians dominated the sabre competition to an even greater extent than they had four years earlier, taking all three of the medals and having seven of the eight finalists in the individual event (they had taken the gold and silver, with five of eight finalists in 1908). Not one of the Hungarian sabrists was eliminated during the first two rounds. The sabre team also successfully defended its gold medal in the team competition. The Hungarians did not fare as well in either the foil or the épée, however, with only one fencer reaching the final in either of those two events as Béla Békessy placed seventh in the foil.

Football

Quarterfinals

Consolation semifinals

Consolation final

Final rank 5th place

Gymnastics

Seventeen gymnasts represented Hungary. The nation entered four gymnasts in the individual competition, with Elemér Pászti having the best performance at 13th place. The Hungarian team entered one of the three team competitions and won the silver medal.

Artistic

Rowing 

Eleven rowers represented Hungary. It was the nation's second appearance in rowing. The Hungarian rowers had little success in 1912. Both of the scullers, including defending bronze medalist Károly Levitzky, had byes in the first round but were eliminated in the quarterfinals. The eights team was also defeated in its first race, in the preliminary heats.

(Ranks given are within each crew's heat.)

Shooting 

Ten shooters competed for Hungary. It was the nation's second appearance in shooting, with Hungary having previously competed in 1908. Hungary won its first medal in shooting when Sándor Prokopp (one of the two Hungarians who had competed in 1908) won the championship in the 300 metre military rifle in three positions.

Tennis 

Six tennis players represented Hungary at the 1912 Games. It was the nation's third appearance in tennis. The Hungarians had little success, compiling a record of 3–7 overall (2–6 when the match between two Hungarians is excluded) and advancing nobody past the round of 16.

 Men

Wrestling

Greco-Roman

Hungary was represented by ten wrestlers in its third Olympic wrestling appearance.

Varga took Hungary's only wrestling medal of the Games, surviving an early loss to reach the medals rounds. He was beaten twice in the medals rounds, finishing with a bronze. Radvány also had a successful Games, advancing to the seventh bout of the elimination round before finally receiving his second loss to take fourth place. The team posted a combined record of 18–21 (18–19 in elimination rounds, 0–2 in the medals rounds).

References

External links
Official Olympic Reports
International Olympic Committee results database

Nations at the 1912 Summer Olympics
1912
Olympics